In South Africa, wards are geopolitical subdivisions of municipalities used for electoral purposes. Each metropolitan and local municipality is delimited by the Municipal Demarcation Board into half as many wards as there are seats on the municipal council (rounding up if there are an odd number of seats). Each ward then elects one councillor directly, and the remaining councillors are elected from party lists so that the overall party representation is proportional to the proportion of votes received by each party.

After the 2021 municipal elections, there are 4,468 wards in South Africa.

References

External links
 Municipal Demarcation Board

Subdivisions of South Africa